Ginnie Hofmann (September 30, 1920 – December 29, 2014) was an American artist and illustrator most noted for her illustrations in the Joy of Cooking and her paper dolls in Betsy McCall magazine.

Early years
Born as Virginia Ritsman in Toledo, Ohio, she attended the Art Academy of Cincinnati from 1938-1942 with James Flora and Richard Staples Dodge.

In July 1944, she married Edward Hofmann whom she remained married to until his death in 1990.

Professional life
In early 1944, at the request of Flora who had recently been promoted to Art Director at Columbia Records, she moved to Westport, Connecticut. She worked as an illustrator at Columbia Records for two years.

Hofmann illustrated the Joy of Cooking, beginning with the Fourth Edition from 1951. Closely associated with the Joy of Cooking aesthetic, her illustrations continue to be used through the current edition.

For 27 years, between 1958 and 1986, Hofmann drew the paper dolls feature in Betsy McCall magazine.

Throughout her career, Hofmann contributed illustrations to other magazines including Mademoiselle (1946–1951), Parents Magazine, Good Housekeeping (1950–1960), and Woman's Day (1950–1960).

Bibliography
Hofmann wrote and illustrated a series of children's books about the comforts and companionship of the teddy bear.
 1978 - Who Wants an Old Teddy Bear?
 1986 - The Runaway Teddy Bear
 1991 - One Teddy Bear is Enough!
 1994 - The Bear Next Door
 1996 - The Big Bad Bully Bear

She also illustrated Betsy McCall: A Paper Doll Story Book (A Little Golden Book).

References 

1920 births
2014 deaths
Artists from Cincinnati
American children's book illustrators
American children's writers
People from Toledo, Ohio
Art Academy of Cincinnati alumni